Audley House is a grade II listed block of flats at 9–12 Margaret Street on the corner with Great Titchfield Street in the City of Westminster, central London, England.

Audley House was built in 1907 by J. W. Simpson and M. Ayrton. It is in red brick with stone dressings and a slate roof. It was built as bachelor flats, with five storeys, a basement, and attics.

References

1907 establishments in England
Buildings and structures completed in 1907
Apartment buildings in London
Grade II listed buildings in the City of Westminster